Somba Opu is a district  located in the Gowa Regency. South Sulawesi, Indonesia, and is part of the greater Makassar area. Somba Opu is one of 18 districts in Gowa Regency. The capital of Gowa, "Sungguminasa" is located in this district and this is the largest regency capital or 2nd largest town in South Sulawesi. A suburb to Makassar, the district is a relatively urbanized area, and can also be called as the city's bedroom community.

Although Somba Opu isn't considered as an official town or city, it has a high population density of 6,021 people per km, and a population of 157,826, all packed into an area of about 28.09 square kilometres.

Geography
The total area is 28.09 km2 or 2,809 Ha (1.49% of the total area of Gowa Regency) with an altitude of 25 meters above sea level. Most of the area is located in the lowlands with geographic coordinates at 5°12'5"S 119°27'15"E. The natural border with the neighbouring district of Pallangga is the Jeneberang River which is a river with a length of 90 km and a river basin area of 881 km2

Main Sights

 Balla Lompoa Museum is a reconstruction of the royal palace of Gowa, which was established during the reign of the 31st King of Gowa, I Mangngi-mangngi Daeng Matutu, in 1936. In Makassar, Balla Lompoa means a large house or the House of greatness. The architecture of this museum building is in the form of a typical Bugis house, a stilt house, with a ladder more than two meters high to enter the patio space. The entire building is made of ironwood or iron wood. This building is in a one hectare complex that is bordered by a high wall fence. This museum serves as a place to store collections of Gowa Kingdom objects. The historical objects are displayed based on the general function of each room in the museum building. At the front of the main building, a map of the Kingdom of Gowa is displayed on the right side of the wall. In the main room the family tree of the Gowa Kingdom starts from the King Gowa I, Tomanurunga in the 13th century, until the last Gowa King Sultan Moch Abdulkadir Aididdin A. Idjo Karaeng Lalongan (1947-1957). Note: Other sources call it Andi Ijo Daeng Mattawang Karaeng Lalolang Sultan Muhammad Abdul Kadir Aididdin.
 Al-Hilal Mosque or better known as Katangka Mosque is one of the oldest mosques in the province of South Sulawesi, Indonesia. Named Katangka Mosque because it is located in the village of Katangka, Somba Opu District, Gowa Regency. In addition, the mosque is called Katangka, because the basic raw materials of the mosque are believed to be taken from the Katangka tree.

Shopping Center and Restaurant

Supermarket
 Satu Sama Supermarket

Traditional Market
 Sungguminasa People's Market
 Minasa Maupa modern Market

Restaurant
 KFC Citraland
 Pizza Hut Citraland
 Burger King Hertasning
 McDonald's Hertasning

Education 
 Alauddin Islamic State University
 Patria Artha University

Villages
Somba Opu is divided into 14 villages

References

South Sulawesi